Allen James Oliver (May 18, 1903 – July 9, 1953) was an American politician from New York.

Life
He was born on May 18, 1903, in Rochester, New York. He was a tax consultant and CPA.

Oliver was a member of the New York State Senate, from 1943 to 1948, sitting in the 164th, 165th and 166th New York State Legislatures. In November 1948, he ran for re-election, but was defeated by Democrat Ray. B. Tuttle.

He died on July 9, 1953, in Rochester, New York, of a heart attack; and was buried at the Riverside Cemetery there.

Sources

External links
 

1903 births
1953 deaths
Politicians from Rochester, New York
Republican Party New York (state) state senators
20th-century American politicians